Kaeriyama (written: 帰山) is a Japanese surname. Notable people with the surname include:

, Japanese film director and film theorist
, Japanese speed skater

Japanese-language surnames